In French, a  is a town hall or city hall.

Hôtel de ville may also refer to:

Buildings 
Belgium
 Antwerp City Hall
 Hôtel de ville de Bruxelles, Brussels
 Hôtel de Ville, Liège

Canada
 Hôtel de ville de Montréal
 Hôtel de ville de Québec, Quebec City

France
 Hôtel de Ville, Arras
 Hôtel de ville de Lille
 Hôtel de Ville, Lyon
 Hôtel de Ville, Paris
 Hôtel de Ville, Reims

Luxembourg
 Hôtel de Ville, Luxembourg City

Netherlands
 Hôtel de ville de Maastricht

Transit stations 
France
 Hôtel de Ville tram stop, Bordeaux
 Hôtel de Ville – Louis Pradel (Lyon Métro), Lyon
 Hôtel de Ville (Paris Métro), Paris

See also